In mathematics, more specifically in algebraic geometry, Parshin's conjecture (also referred to as the Beilinson–Parshin conjecture) states that for any smooth projective variety X defined over a finite field, the higher algebraic K-groups vanish up to torsion:

It is named after Aleksei Nikolaevich Parshin and Alexander Beilinson.

Finite fields
The conjecture holds if  by Quillen's computation of the K-groups of finite fields, showing in particular that they are finite groups.

Curves
The conjecture holds if  by the proof of Corollary 3.2.3 of Harder.
Additionally, by Quillen's finite generation result (proving the Bass conjecture for the K-groups in this case) it follows that the K-groups are finite if .

References

Algebraic geometry
Algebraic K-theory
Conjectures